Count Louis I of Nassau-Weilburg (1473 – 28 May 1523) was a son of Count John III of Nassau-Weilburg and his wife, Elisabeth of Hesse.  In 1492, Louis I succeeded his grandfather Philip II as Count of Nassau-Weilburg, because his father had already died in 1480.

In 1502, Louis I married Margaret (1487-1548), a daughter of Adolf III of Nassau-Wiesbaden-Idstein and Margarethe von Hanau-Lichtenberg. Louis and Margaret had the following children:
 Philip III (1504-1559)
 Anna (1505-1564), married in 1523 to John III, Count of Nassau-Beilstein
 Louis (1507-1507)
 Louis (1508-1510)
 Elisabeth
 John

Ancestors

Counts of Nassau
1473 births
1523 deaths
House of Nassau
15th-century German people
16th-century German people